Boyce Brown (April 16, 1910 – January 30, 1959) was an American jazz dixieland alto saxophonist born in Chicago, Illinois.

Brown worked with Wingy Manone, Paul Mares, and Danny Alvin. His best-known recordings are a 1935 session with Paul Mares and his Friars Society Orchestra (first issued on LP in 1955 as part of Columbia's Chicago Style Jazz album) and a 1939 session with Jimmy McPartland & his Jazz Band, which was first released as part of Decca's Chicago Jazz album. In both sessions, Brown demonstrates a driving, harmonically advanced style.

In 1953, Brown entered a monastery of the Roman Catholic Servite Order, but returned in 1956 to release his one and only album as Brother Matthew, backed by a band organized by Eddie Condon.

References
New York Times obituary

1910 births
1959 deaths
American jazz saxophonists
American male saxophonists
Dixieland saxophonists
Converts to Roman Catholicism
Servites
20th-century American saxophonists
20th-century American male musicians
American male jazz musicians